The Girl Scout Association of Mongolia (Монголын Эмэгтэй Скаутын Холбоо, transliterated Mongoliyn Emegteǐ Scoutiyn Kholboo) is the national Guiding organization of Mongolia. It serves 1,050 members (as of 2008). Founded in 1996, the girls-only organization became an associate member of the World Association of Girl Guides and Girl Scouts in 2005 and a full member in 2014. 

The Girl Scout Motto is Belen Bol, Be Prepared in Mongol.

Sources

See also
Mongolyn Skautyn Kholboo

Scouting in Mongolia
World Association of Girl Guides and Girl Scouts member organizations
Youth organizations established in 1996